Pat Cash and Mark Woodforde successfully defended their title, defeating Jeremy Bates and Anders Järryd in the final, 6–3, 6–4 to win the senior gentlemen's invitation doubles tennis title at the 2012 Wimbledon Championships.

Draw

Final

Group A
Standings are determined by: 1. number of wins; 2. number of matches; 3. in two-players-ties, head-to-head records; 4. in three-players-ties, percentage of sets won, or of games won; 5. steering-committee decision.

Group B
Standings are determined by: 1. number of wins; 2. number of matches; 3. in two-players-ties, head-to-head records; 4. in three-players-ties, percentage of sets won, or of games won; 5. steering-committee decision.

References
Draw

Men's Invitation Doubles, Senior